The 2002 Las Vegas Desert Classic was the inaugural staging of a darts tournament by the Professional Darts Corporation. It featured the top players from the PDC along with an opportunity for players from North America to qualify. Over 200 players entered the event, but the last 16 featured mostly British-based players – the only exceptions being Roland Scholten and former World Champion John Part who participate regularly in UK tournaments.

This event featured an unusual format - sets were played over the best of seven legs, rather than the more standard best of five or three legs. 

The total prize fund was US$58,000 and Phil Taylor won the title beating Ronnie Baxter in the final.

Prize Fund

Results

Men's tournament

Preliminary round

Main Round 4-7 July

Women's tournament

References

Las Vegas Desert Classic
Las Vegas Desert Classic